Simone Mattia (born 19 January 1996) is an Italian professional footballer who plays as a midfielder.

References 

1996 births
Living people
people from Marino, Lazio
Italian footballers
S.S. Lazio players
A.S. Sambenedettese players
F.C. Rieti players
Paganese Calcio 1926 players
Serie C players
Association football midfielders
Footballers from Lazio
Sportspeople from the Metropolitan City of Rome Capital